Edson Hart Deal (November 11, 1903 – April 22, 1967) was an American politician, Republican from Idaho. Deal was elected to the Idaho State Senate in 1940 and served for ten years, until his election as lieutenant governor in 1950. He served four years in that office, during the administration of Governor Len Jordan, and over a decade later was elected secretary of state in 1966.

Deal was in office less than four months when he suffered a fatal heart attack at age 63 while mowing his lawn in Boise. His successor was House speaker Pete Cenarrusa, appointed by Governor Don Samuelson. Cenarrusa continued as secretary of state for over 35 years, until 2003.

Personal
Deal was in the insurance business in Nampa. He married Gwendolyn Shepard of Eugene, Oregon, in 1936, and they had three children: daughter Pat and two sons, Fred and Bruce.

References

External links
Edson Hart Deal entry at The Political Graveyard

1903 births
1967 deaths
Republican Party Idaho state senators
Lieutenant Governors of Idaho
People from Weiser, Idaho
Secretaries of State of Idaho
Businesspeople from Idaho
20th-century American businesspeople
20th-century American politicians